The 2015–16 Michigan Wolverines men's basketball team represented the University of Michigan during the 2015–16 NCAA Division I men's basketball season. The team played its home games in Ann Arbor, Michigan for the 49th consecutive year at the Crisler Center, which has a capacity of 12,707. This season marked the program's 100th season and its 99th consecutive year as a member of the Big Ten Conference. The team was led by 9th year head coach John Beilein. Because this was Michigan's 100th season, the team was known as Squad 100 or Team 100

The 2014–15 Wolverines had entered the season coming off the school's winningest two-year stretch in history, but it did not reach the NCAA Division I men's basketball tournament after losing starters Caris LeVert and Derrick Walton to season-ending injuries in January. The 2015–16 team follows the first season in five years in which the school did not make the NCAA Tournament. In addition to the season-ending injuries for LeVert and Walton the prior season, the team was coming off an offseason which saw Spike Albrecht and Zak Irvin have surgeries. Albrecht retired from the sport in December, although he later changed his mind. Later that month, Levert had an injury that ended his season. He only played in one conference game. He led the team in many statistical categories at the time of his injury and made midseason watchlists for various major national awards.

The team won two games in the 2016 Big Ten Conference men's basketball tournament and one in the play-in game versus Tulsa, also known as the First Four. The Wolverines finished the season 23–13.  Following the season, Walton and Irvin were among the All-Big Ten conference honorees. Walton was a third team selection by the coaches and honorable mention selection by the media. Irvin was an honorable mention selection by both.

2015–16 recruits
On March 11, 2015, Michigan offered a scholarship to German Euroleague player Moritz "Moe" Wagner and he committed to Michigan on April 5. Brent Hibbitts accepted a preferred walk-on role with the class of 2015 over scholarships from Central Michigan, Western Michigan, Vermont, Appalachian State and American University.

Future recruits

2016–17
On August 7, 2014, Jon Teske, who lived in the Grand Rapids, Michigan suburb Grandville until he was 10 and his family moved to Medina, Ohio, committed to Michigan via Twitter. On April 16, 2015, Austin Davis of Onsted, Michigan committed to Michigan. On May 11, Tyus Battle committed to Michigan. At the time of Battle's signing, the entire set of scholarships for the class of 2016 seemed to be allocated.  On June 19, Battle decommitted from Michigan. On July 28, Ibi Watson committed to Michigan from Caris LeVert's alma mater Pickerington High School Central. On September 9, Xavier Simpson committed to the team. At the time he was ranked as the number 66 player and number 12 point guard by ESPN, number 55 and number 12 by Scout.com and number 87 player and number 44 guard by Rivals.com, making him the number 69 player and 13 point guard by 247Sports.com. Davis, Teske, Watson and Simpson all signed their National Letters of Intent on November 11, 2015.

Among the accomplishments of the recruits are Simpson earning the 2015 Ohio Associated Press Division I Player of the Year and Davis earning the 2015 Michigan Associated Press Class B Player of the Year awards as juniors as well as Simpson's 2014 Ohio Division III state championship.

2017–18
On October 23, 2015, four-star recruit Jordan Poole became the first commitment for the Class of 2017 after a home gym visit from Beilein and assistant coach Jordan and multiple Michigan campus visits. Poole had several competing offers including Illinois, Indiana, Nebraska, Memphis, Marquette, and Auburn.

Departures

In June 2015, Bielfeldt announced that he had decided to use his redshirt year to play for the 2015–16 Indiana Hoosiers after the Hoosiers dismissed two forwards from the team the month before. Bielfeldt had considered several midwest schools and DePaul, Nebraska and Iowa State were his other finalists.

Preseason

In April 2015, Spike Albrecht had offseason surgery on his right hip to correct for a genetic condition that may also necessitate left hip surgery. Following the 2015 NCAA Division I men's basketball tournament several pollsters (including ESPN, USA Today, NBC Sports) omitted Michigan from the expected preseason top 25, however some that immediately projected Caris LeVert to return to Michigan included Michigan in the rankings: CBS Sports (#18) and Sports Illustrated (#16). Bleacher Report ranked Michigan at 25 noting lower expectations if LeVert declared himself eligible for the 2015 NBA draft. On April 21, LeVert announced that he would return for his senior season. That same day, Max Bielfeldt was released from his athletic scholarship with one year of eligibility remaining. Despite all 13 of its scholarships being committed at the time, Michigan continued to recruit five-star 2015 McDonald's All-American Jaylen Brown and four-star Kenny Williams for the class of 2015.

A scholarship for one of the potential recruits became available on April 27, when Beilein and rising sophomore Austin Hatch announced that Hatch, who had survived two plane crashes that killed his parents, siblings, and stepmother, would no longer play for the team due to medical issues stemming from injuries he suffered in the second crash. Michigan applied for and received a "medical exemption waiver" from the NCAA for Hatch; the waiver allows a school to keep a student-athlete who has career-ending medical issues on scholarship. Hatch transitioned to being a student assistant coach; as such, he was no longer on the active roster but could otherwise fully participate in the program. However, Brown committed to California on May 1. Williams committed to North Carolina on May 2.

On September 9, Beilein announced that Zak Irvin would be sidelined for 6–8 weeks, but that he was expected to be available near the beginning of the season.

The October 15 Preseason Coaches Poll listed five teams from the 2015–16 Big Ten Conference, while 3 others, including Michigan, were receiving votes. Michigan had the most votes of teams not included in the top 25. Two weeks later the preseason AP Poll included six Big Ten Teams with Michigan listed at number 25. Athlon Sports listed Michigan at 22.  Sporting News ranked Michigan at number 18. NBC Sports listed them at 17. ESPN's 10-person panel selected ranked Michigan 22. Blue Ribbon College Basketball Yearbook selected Michigan 17. Sports Illustrated ranked all 351 teams and listed Michigan at 27. The United States Basketball Writers Association (USBWA) ranked Michigan 23.

Caris LeVert was named a preseason All-Big Ten selection, for the second straight year. He was also one of three Big Ten selections to the 20-man Jerry West Award preseason watchlist. He made the initial 50-man John R. Wooden Award watch list on November 17. On December 2, Levert earned recognition on the 50-man Naismith College Player of the Year watchlist and 33-man Oscar Robertson Trophy watchlists. That same day, Albrecht was named an Allstate Good Works Team nominee.

The team hosted its annual media day on October 22. The preseason would wind down with an open practice on November 2 followed by a "Squad 100 Selfie" promotion hour. Then the team had an exhibition game against  on November 6, which pitted head coach Beilein's team against that of his son Patrick Beilein. Two days before the exhibition contest, Michigan extended Beilein's contract through the 2020–21 season.

Schedule

The 2015–16 academic year marked 150 years of intercollegiate athletics for the Michigan Wolverines and the 100th season of intercollegiate men's basketball for Michigan Wolverines men's basketball. Michigan participated in the 2015 Battle 4 Atlantis along with Gonzaga, Syracuse, Texas, Texas A&M, UConn, Washington, and Charlotte. Each of these eight teams travelled to the Bahamas for the 3-game tournament from November 25–27, 2015, and each team played one game per day. Michigan played Penn State at the Madison Square Garden on January 30, 2016 as part of "Big Ten Day", a day-night doubleheader featuring a hockey and a basketball matchup between both schools. Michigan hosted Xavier in the inaugural Gavitt Tipoff Games on November 20, 2015. As part of a home-and-away with the 2014–15 and 2015–16 SMU teams, Michigan also played SMU in Dallas on December 8, 2015. The Wolverines made a trip to NC State for the ACC-Big Ten Challenge, as well.

November
On November 6, Beilein led the Wolverines over his son Patrick's  team 74–52 in the team's only exhibition game as LeVert posted 22 points. The team was led by LeVert who posted a game-high 18 points and 5 assists in his return to the lineup and Aubrey Dawkins who added 15 points on 6–of–7. However Irvin remained on the sidelines. On November 16, Michigan defeated Elon as Walton led all players with 24 points, six rebounds and seven assists. Duncan Robinson added 19 points including all six shot attempts (5 three point shots). Zak Irvin made his first appearance with three assists. On November 20, Michigan suffered its first loss of the season to Xavier in the inaugural Gavitt Tipoff Games, despite a game-high 29 points by LeVert. Irvin made his first start of the season, scoring seven points and one rebound. During the game, the team unveiled its new logo, "We 100", on its pregame warmups which matched the team hashtag #squad100. Before beginning the 2015 Battle 4 Atlantis in Nassau, Bahamas, Beilein noted that Mark Donnal would not be in the starting lineup going forward. On November 25, Michigan lost to (#18 AP Poll/#21 Coaches Poll) UConn at the Battle 4 Atlantis. After getting off to a 12–5 lead, Michigan fell behind by 36–22 at the half and as much as 19 points in the second half. When Michigan defeated Charlotte 102–47 on November 26, the team set Battle 4 Atlantis records for points, margin of victory and shooting percentage (61%). The game featured freshman Moritz Wagner's 19-point performance on 8–9 shooting from the field. Michigan allowed no second chance points. The team's 55-point victory was the largest for the Wolverines since 1946, when the team defeated Chicago by 58. It was also the largest defeat in Charlotte 49ers men's basketball history and the first time Michigan defeated Charlotte in three tries. Michigan defeated Texas 78–72 on November 27 on 14–25 three point shooting including 11 in the first half to jump out to a 12-point lead.

December
Michigan defeated NC State 66–59 in the ACC–Big Ten Challenge on December 1. Walton sprained his left ankle in the first half of the game. Michigan defeated Houston Baptist 82–57 on December 5. With Walton sidelined, LeVert started at point guard. On December 8, Michigan lost 82–58 to (19/-) SMU as LeVert slumped on 1–13 field goal shooting. On December 11, Albrecht announced he was ending his college basketball career due to injuries. On December 12, Michigan defeated Delaware State 80–33, as six Wolverines scored in double figures. The last time Michigan had six players in double figures was January 26, 2002, when the 2001–02 Wolverines did so against . Michigan held Delaware State to just 24-percent shooting from the field, the lowest shooting percentage by any Michigan opponent since  shot 22.2 percent on November 13, 2010 against the 2010–11 Wolverines. Robinson made his first start of his career, and Andrew Dakich made his season debut. On December 15, Michigan defeated Northern Kentucky 77–62. LeVert finished with 13 points, 10 rebounds and 10 assists, becoming the fourth player in Michigan program history to record a triple-double, and the 49th Wolverine to eclipse 1,000 career points. Walton returned from an ankle injury that sidelined him for three games, and posted 16 points, one rebound, one assist and one steal. On December 19, Michigan defeated Youngstown State 105–46. Walton finished with 10 points, 11 rebounds and 13 assists, becoming the fifth player in Michigan program history to record a triple-double. This was the first time in program history two players recorded triple-doubles in consecutive games. The win was the second largest in school history, behind only the 67–7 victory over Detroit Naval Station in 1919 and the game marked the second time since at least the 1996–97 season that any team had posted back-to-back triple doubles and the first time by different players. Based on his triple double against Northern Kentucky and a 19-point effort against Youngstown State, LeVert earned Co-Big Ten Player of the Week honors (along with Malcolm Hill) on December 21. On December 23, Michigan completed its preconference schedule with a 96–60 victory over Bryant. On December 30, Michigan defeated Illinois 78–68 in its Big Ten Conference opener. LeVert posted a 22-point, 10-assist double-double and Mark Donnal had a career night with new career highs in points (26), rebounds (9), blocks (3), and minutes (28).

January 
On January 2, Michigan defeated Penn State 79–56. Michigan showed its seventh different starting lineup of the season, as LeVert was out due to a lower left leg injury. The game marked the seventh time this season Michigan had four or more players score in double figures. On January 7, Michigan lost to (#20/#18) Purdue 70–87 in the first of three consecutive games against ranked opponents. Muhammad Ali Abdur Rahkman scored a career-high and game-high 25 points. On January 12 with LeVert still sidelined, Michigan defeated (#3/#3) Maryland 70–67. Irvin posted a season-high and game-high 22 points; Walton had a 12-point/10-rebound double-double and Robinson added 17 points on 5-for-9 three-point shooting. With the win over Maryland, Michigan defeated a top-three nationally ranked opponent at Crisler Center for the first time since the 1997–98 team defeated No. 3 Duke, 81–73, on December 13, 1997. On January 17, Michigan fell to (#16/#19) Iowa 82–71. On January 20, Michigan defeated Minnesota 74–69 behind 22 points by Walton and a 19-point, 11-rebound double-double by Irvin. On January 23, Michigan defeated Nebraska 81–68, behind 21 points by Robinson, and a 19-point, 12-rebound double-double by Walton. Michigan began both halves of the game with hot shooting taking an 18–6 lead in the first half and then building a 33–30 halftime lead into a 54–36 lead by making their first nine shots in the second half. On January 27, Michigan defeated Rutgers, remaining unbeaten in eight all-time meetings against the Scarlet Knights. The win, their 16th victory of the season, matched their total from the 2014–15 season. On January 30, Michigan defeated Penn State 79–72 in the inaugural B1G Super Saturday game at Madison Square Garden. Walton posted 13 points, 10 rebounds, and seven assists, recording his second double-double in the last three games.

February 
After building an early 11-point lead on February 2, Michigan eventually went scoreless for the final 9:05 of the first half as (#22/21) Indiana scored the final 25 points of the half on way to an 80–67 victory. Entering the February 6 rivalry game against (#10/10) Michigan State, Michigan had posted a 1–5 record against top 25 teams, with 5 double digit losses. In the game, Michigan endured back-to-back defeats for the second time this season, losing 89–73 despite a 19–9 turnover margin including a season high 11 steals. On February 10, Michigan defeated Minnesota behind a career-high 26 points by Walton and a perfect shooting night from Abdur-Rakman (5-for-5 from the field and 3-for-3 from the line) for 16 points. On February 13, Michigan defeated (#18/16) Purdue, 61–56. Irvin scored 16 of his game-high 22 points in the second half, as the Wolverines finished the game on an 11–0 scoring run after falling behind 56–50 with three minutes to play. After missing the previous 11 games, LeVert recorded five rebounds and one assist in 11 minutes. Michigan commemorated the 100th anniversary of Wolverines basketball during a celebration at the game. On February 16, Michigan lost to Ohio State 66–76. Irvin finished with 15 points, nine rebounds, three assists, and two steals, becoming the 50th Wolverine to eclipse 1,000 career points. On February 21, Michigan lost to (#5/6) Maryland 82–86, despite a game-high 25 points and five blocks from Donnal. On February 24, Michigan defeated Northwestern 72–63. Michigan fell behind early after it had a scoring drought of nearly six minutes to open the game, as they missed its first eight shots. They finished the first half shooting 12-of-17 from the field to cut Northwestern's lead from 11 points to one. On February 28, Michigan lost to Wisconsin 57–68, in their final road game of the season. Michigan was held to a season-low for 3-point attempts in going 5-of-13.

March
On March 1, the team announced that LeVert would sit out the remainder of the season to concentrate on his continued recovery after suffering a lower left leg injury at the end of December. On March 5, Michigan lost to (#15/#16) Iowa, 61–71, in their Big Ten Conference finale, to finish the regular season at 20–11 (11–8 Big Ten). Prior to the game for senior night, Michigan celebrated the accomplishments and careers of seniors Spike Albrecht and Caris LeVert, whose senior seasons were both cut short due to injuries. Freshman Fred Wright-Jones, who has been a manager and practice player the entire season, was allowed to suit up for the game.

Postseason
After a bye in the first round of the 2016 Big Ten Conference men's basketball tournament, Michigan played Northwestern on March 10. Michigan scored 16 consecutive points early to take a 16–3 lead. Northwestern cut the lead to two points before Michigan took a nine-point lead into the half. Michigan opened up a 12-point lead a couple of times in the second half before Northwestern took a 55–54 lead with 3:27 remaining. On Northwestern's final possession of regulation, Alex Olah forced overtime with a rebound and a field goal. In overtime, Robinson made a three-point shot to tie the score at 70 with 46.5 seconds remaining. Irvin scored the game-winning basket in front of his hometown crowd at Bankers Life Fieldhouse with 3.3 seconds left. Robinson led the way with 21 points; while Irvin added 19 points and eight rebounds and Abdur-Rahkman posted 14 points. This was just the second overtime game in Michigan's Big Ten tournament history. Michigan defeated Purdue, 79–73, on March 14, 1999. The game marked Irvin's 100th career game with Michigan, becoming just the 64th Wolverine to reach the milestone. On March 11, Michigan defeated No. 1-seeded (#10/#10) Indiana in the quarterfinals of the Big Ten tournament, 72–69. Kameron Chatman scored the game-winning three-pointer as time expired to give the Wolverines the win. Irvin led the way with a team-high 17 points, while Walton set a Big Ten tournament single-game record with 12 assists. Robinson again put Michigan in position to win by tying the score with a three-point shot with 46 seconds remaining. Michigan recorded six three-pointers in the game, to set a new single-season program record for three-pointers in a season with 320, surpassing the previous record of 319 set during the 2013–14 season. On March 12, Michigan lost to (#13/#13) Purdue in the semifinals of the Big Ten tournament, 59–76. Purdue opened the game with an 8–0 scoring run and took a 38–30 lead into halftime. After trailing by as many as 17 early in the second half, the Wolverines fought back to within six only to be outscored 16–5 in the last 7:35 of the game. Abdur-Rahkman led the way with 15 points, while Walton added 14 points and Irvin posted 11 points. Michigan recorded six three-pointers in the game to extend their single-season record for three-pointers in a season to 326. With five assists in the game, Walton is now tied for third-most assists in a single Big Ten tournament with 22, with Brent Darby (2003). Robinson recorded his 90th three-pointer of the season, becoming just the fifth Wolverine in history to reach the milestone in a single season. Irvin was selected to the All-Tournament Team.

On March 13, Michigan received an at-large bid to the 2016 NCAA tournament. The Wolverines are the No. 11 seed in the East Region and faced No. 11 Tulsa in the First Four on March 16 in Dayton, Ohio. Michigan is in the tournament field for the fifth time in the last six seasons after missing out on the 2015 tournament field. Beilein's Wolverines advanced to the national title game in 2013 and followed with an Elite Eight performance in 2014. Michigan is one of three Big Ten teams in the east region (along with Wisconsin and Indiana). On March 16 in the First Four, Michigan defeated Tulsa, 67–62, to advance to the First Round of the NCAA Tournament. After falling behind 16–9, Michigan ended the first half on a 19–4 scoring run to take an eight-point lead into halftime. Irvin hit the go-ahead three-pointer with 53 seconds left to put the Wolverines up by two points. Michigan was led by Abdur-Rahkman and Irvin with 16 points, while Robinson recorded his first double-double with 13 points and 11 rebounds. The game was the first-ever meeting between the two teams in program history. Michigan recorded six three-pointers in the game to extend their single-season record for three-pointers in a season to 332. On March 18, Michigan lost to No. 6 seed Notre Dame, 63–70. Michigan finished the first half on a 7–0 run to take a 41–29 lead at halftime. Notre Dame came out with a 15–5 run to start the second half, cutting Michigan's lead to three points. Notre Dame did not take a lead in the game until Beacham's three-pointer with 9:26 left to make it 51–48. From there on there were five lead changes and three ties. Abdur-Rahkman led Michigan in scoring with 15 points, four rebounds, three assists and one steal, while Walton recorded a career-high six steals, along with 10 points, eight assists and four rebounds. Michigan recorded 10 three-pointers in the game to extend their single-season record for three-pointers in a season to 342.

|-
!colspan=12 style="background:#242961; color:#F7BE05;"| Exhibition

|-
!colspan=12 style="background:#242961; color:#F7BE05;"| Non-conference Regular Season

|-
!colspan=12 style="background:#242961;"| Big Ten Regular Season

|-
!colspan=12 style="background:#242961;"| Big Ten tournament

|-
!colspan=12 style="background:#242961;"| NCAA tournament

Statistics
The team posted the following statistics:

Roster
Donnal was reclassified from redshirt sophomore to junior at Michigan at the beginning of the season, indicating that he might not use all of his three remaining years of eligibility at Michigan.

Coaching staff

Support Staff
Peter Kahler – Director of Basketball Operations
Chris Hunter – Director of Player Personnel
Will Vergollo – Video Analyst
Bryan Smothers – Graduate Manager

Rankings

Midseason recognition
LeVert was one of four Big Ten athletes (along with Melo Trimble, Jarrod Uthoff and Denzel Valentine) among the 25 players included in the Wooden Award Midseason Top 25 Watch List on January 13. On February 2, LeVert was one of two Big Ten athletes (along with Malcolm Hill) named one of 10 finalists for the Jerry West Award, despite having missed the last 8 of Michigan's 22 games.

Honors
Following the 2015–16 Big Ten season, Walton was listed as a third team All-Big Ten selection by the coaches and an honorable mention All-Big Ten selection by the media, while Irvin was an honorable mention selection by both. Max Bielfeldt, who left the team prior to the season, was voted the Sixth Man of the Year by the coaches for his contributions to the regular season champion Indiana Hoosiers. Irvin was selected to the 2016 Big Ten Conference men's basketball tournament All-Tournament Team. Following the season, Levert was invited to the NBA Draft Combine.

Team players drafted into the NBA
LeVert was selected with the 20th overall pick in the 2016 NBA Draft by the Indiana Pacers, however his draft rights were traded to the Brooklyn Nets along with a future protected 2nd round pick in return for forward Thaddeus Young. LeVert became Michigan's 5th first round draft selection since 2013 and the fourth player drafted from Michigan's 2012 entering class.

Sources:

References

Michigan Wolverines men's basketball seasons
Michigan
Michigan
Michigan
Michigan